Adrian Mannarino (born 29 June 1988) is a French professional tennis player. He has a career-high ATP singles ranking of world No. 22, attained on 19 March 2018. He won his first ATP Tour singles title at the 2019 Rosmalen Open on grass. He is currently the fourth highest ranked French player.

Tennis career

2007–2011
Mannarino made his Grand Slam singles debut at the 2007 French Open, where as a wild card, he lost in the first qualifying round to Marin Čilić in straight sets.

Mannarino received a wild card for the singles main draw of his home Grand Slam tournament, the 2008 French Open, where he lost to Argentine qualifier Diego Junqueira in the first round in straight sets. He also received a wild card for the 2008 French Open men's doubles (it was his Grand Slam men's doubles debut), losing in the first round.

Mannarino played at the 2008 Open de Moselle in France, entering the singles main draw as a qualifier; he reached the semifinals, defeating sixth seed Andreas Seppi in the first round, Rik de Voest in the second round, Marc Gicquel in the quarterfinals, before losing to Paul-Henri Mathieu in the semifinals 
in two tiebreaks. As a wild card, he lost in the main draw singles first round of the 2008 Paris Masters to Dmitry Tursunov. In November 2008, he played in an ATP Challenger Tour tournament in Jersey, where, seeded fourth, he won the singles event, defeating Andreas Beck in two tiebreaks in the final. He participated in the inaugural Masters France in December 2008, an exhibition tournament, along with a number of top French players, but lost his three round-robin matches in straight sets to Paul-Henri Mathieu, Michaël Llodra and Arnaud Clément.

He received a main draw singles wild card for the 2009 Australian Open, where he lost to 14th seed Fernando Verdasco in the first round.

In 2011, he lost in the main draw singles second round of the Australian Open and Wimbledon, falling to six-time champion Roger Federer in the latter in straight sets.

2013–2016: First Major singles fourth round, semifinal & Masters quarterfinal in doubles 
At the 2013 Wimbledon Championships, Mannarino beat Pablo Andújar in the first round, losing only six games. He then reached the singles third round of a Grand Slam for the first time, after his second round opponent John Isner was forced to retire at 1–1 in the first set due to a knee injury. He then beat qualifier Dustin Brown, who had just beaten Lleyton Hewitt to reach the fourth round. He pushed veteran Łukasz Kubot to five sets in his fourth-round match, but ultimately lost, setting up an all-Polish quarterfinal between Kubot and up-and-coming player Jerzy Janowicz.

At the 2015 Miami Open, Mannarino was the 28th seed and thus received a bye into the second round where he defeated Albert Ramos Viñolas. He beat 7th seed and the 2014 Australian Open singles champion Stanislas Wawrinka in the third round but lost to unseeded Dominic Thiem in three sets in the fourth round.

Mannarino reached his first career Masters 1000 doubles quarterfinal at the 2015 Mutua Madrid Open. He and his partner Juan Sebastián Cabal were defeated in the quarterfinals by the Indian-Romanian pair and eventual champions Rohan Bopanna and Florin Mergea.

At the 2016 Australian Open, the unseeded pair of Mannarino and Lucas Pouille defeated three seeded pairs (including the top-seeded pair of Horia Tecău and Jean-Julien Rojer in the quarterfinals) to reach the semifinals, where they lost to Jamie Murray and Bruno Soares. That was Mannarino's first career Grand Slam doubles semifinal appearance.

2017: First Masters 1000 quarterfinal & ATP 500 singles final
The unseeded Mannarino reached his third career ATP World Tour singles final at the 2017 Antalya Open; he defeated two seeded players Borna Ćorić (in the first round) and Fernando Verdasco (in the quarterfinals) to advance to the final, where he lost to Yūichi Sugita in straight sets.

At the Wimbledon Championships one week later, Mannarino upset no. 19 seed Feliciano López in the first round and no. 15 seed Gaël Monfils in the third round before losing to no. 2 seed Novak Djokovic in the fourth round.

He reached his first career ATP World Tour Masters 1000 singles quarterfinal at the 2017 Rogers Cup, where he upset no. 6 seed and world no. 10 Milos Raonic in the second round before losing to Denis Shapovalov in the quarterfinals.

The unseeded Mannarino defeated top seed and world no. 5 Marin Čilić (the biggest singles win of his career and his first career win over a member of the Top 5 in the ATP singles rankings) in the semifinals of the Japan Open to reach his first career ATP World Tour 500 Series singles final, where he lost to fourth-seeded David Goffin. In October, Mannarino reached his third ATP World Tour singles semifinal of 2017 at the Kremlin Cup, where he lost to Ričardas Berankis. The following week, the 7th seeded Mannarino lost in the quarterfinals of the Swiss Indoors to top seed Roger Federer in three sets.

2018: Australian Open third round & top 25 singles debut 
Mannarino played his first tournament of 2018 at the Sydney International. Seeded fifth, he reached the quarterfinals and lost to fourth seed Fabio Fognini. Seeded 26th at the Australian Open, he reached the singles main draw third round for the first time in his career where he lost to fifth seed Dominic Thiem in straight sets.

Mannarino made his Davis Cup debut in the 2018 Davis Cup World Group first round tie against the Netherlands, replacing Lucas Pouille who had withdrawn a few hours before the start of his first singles match on 2 February against Thiemo de Bakker because of torticollis. Mannarino lost his first singles match against Thiemo de Bakker (who was world no. 369 in the ATP singles rankings) in three sets but won his second singles match against Robin Haase in five sets to give the French an unassailable lead against the Dutch.

In the first week of February, the second-seeded Mannarino was upset by the unseeded Marcos Baghdatis in three sets in the second round of the Sofia Open.  One week later, the fourth-seeded Mannarino lost in the semifinals of the New York Open to the second seed Sam Querrey in three tight sets. Mannarino lost before the quarterfinal round of the singles main draw of his next four ATP World Tour tournaments in Acapulco, Indian Wells, Miami and Monte-Carlo.  Despite these results he reached a career-high singles ranking of No. 22 on 19 March 2018.

At the Barcelona Open, the 11th-seeded Mannarino held three match points in the final set of his third round match against the 5th-seeded Pablo Carreño Busta before the latter won the match by winning the tight final-set tie-break.

2019: Maiden ATP Tour singles title in Rosmalen
Mannarino started his 2019 season at the Qatar ExxonMobil Open. He lost in the first round to Dušan Lajović. In Sydney, he was defeated in the first round by Australian wildcard Jordan Thompson. At the Australian Open, he fell in the first round to fifth seed Kevin Anderson.

As the top seed at the Open de Rennes, Mannarino was eliminated in the second round by Jurij Rodionov. At the Sofia Open, he was beaten in the first round by German qualifier Yannick Maden. Seeded fifth at the New York Open, he lost in the first round to eventual champion Reilly Opelka. Seeded eighth at the Delray Beach Open, he got his first win of the season by beating Brayden Schnur in the first round. He ended up losing in the quarterfinals to second seed John Isner. In Acapulco, he was defeated in the first round by third seed John Isner. At the Indian Wells Masters, he made it to the second round where he was eliminated by sixth seed Kei Nishikori; he served for the match at 6–5 in the third set but failed to close out the match. At the Miami Open, he was beaten in the second round by 13th seed Daniil Medvedev.

Starting his clay-court season at the Monte-Carlo Masters, Mannarino lost in the first round to Cameron Norrie. Seeded second at the BNP Paribas Primrose Bordeaux, he reached the quarterfinals where he fell to ninth seed and eventual finalist, Mikael Ymer. In Madrid, he was defeated in the final round of qualifying by Martin Kližan. However, due to the withdrawal of Jo-Wilfried Tsonga, he was awarded a lucky loser spot into the main draw. He lost in the second round to eighth seed and eventual finalist, Stefanos Tsitsipas. As the top seed in Lisbon, he suffered a second round loss at the hands of Steve Darcis. Seeded sixth at the Geneva Open, he lost in the first round to Albert Ramos Viñolas. At the French Open, he was knocked out of the tournament in the second round by 14th seed Gaël Monfils.

At the Rosmalen Grass Court Championships, his first grass-court tournament of the season, Mannarino reached the final by beating Dutch wildcard Thiemo de Bakker, fourth seed Fernando Verdasco, fifth seed David Goffin, and second seed Borna Ćorić. 
He defeated Jordan Thompson in the final to finally emerged victorious in an ATP Tour singles final after having lost all his previous six. Seeded second and two-time finalist at the Antalya Open, he reached the quarterfinals where he was beaten by eventual champion Lorenzo Sonego. At Wimbledon, he lost in the first round to 13th seed and 2017 finalist, Marin Čilić.

Seeded second at the Hall of Fame Open, Mannarino was defeated in the second round by Tennys Sandgren. In Washington, D.C., he was eliminated in the second round by lucky loser Norbert Gombos. At the Rogers Cup, he dismissed 11th seed Borna Ćorić from the tournament in the second round. He was beaten in the third round by seventh seed Fabio Fognini. Playing in Cincinnati, he lost in the third round to 16th seed and eventual finalist, David Goffin. At the US Open, he was defeated in the first round by Dan Evans.

Seeded seventh at the St. Petersburg Open, Mannarino fell in the second round to qualifier Egor Gerasimov. At the first edition of the Zhuhai Championships, he reached his second final of the season after wins over Chinese wildcard Ze Zhang, top seed Stefanos Tsitsipas, qualifier Damir Džumhur, and eighth seed Albert Ramos Viñolas. He lost in the championship match to seventh seed Alex de Minaur. In Tokyo, he was defeated in the first round by qualifier and eventual finalist, John Millman. At the Rolex Shanghai Masters, he fell in the first round of qualifying to Vasek Pospisil. Seeded seventh at the Kremlin Cup, he reached his third singles final of the season. He ended up losing to sixth seed and Russian Andrey Rublev. At the Vienna Open, he was beaten in the first round by Sam Querrey. His final tournament of the year was the Paris Masters. He defeated qualifier Casper Ruud in the first round. He lost in the second round to second seed Rafael Nadal.

Mannarino ended the year ranked 43.

2020: Top 35 year-end ranking
Mannarino began his 2020 season at the Qatar ExxonMobil Open. Seeded seventh, he lost in the first round to Alexander Bublik. Seeded seventh at the Auckland Open, he was defeated in the first round by Andreas Seppi. At the Australian Open, he was eliminated in the first round by fifth seed and eventual finalist, Dominic Thiem.

After the Australian Open, Mannarino played at the Open Sud de France in Montpellier, France. He beat Alexei Popyrin in the first round to get his first win of the season. He was then beaten in the second round by top seed and eventual champion, Gaël Monfils. In Rotterdam, he lost in the first round to Pablo Carreño Busta. Seeded seventh at the Delray Beach Open, he suffered a first round defeat at the hands of Kwon Soon-woo. Competing in Acapulco, he failed to convert match points in the third set and was eventually eliminated by the seventh seed and 2014 champion, Grigor Dimitrov, in their second round three-set thriller. As the top seed at the Monterrey Challenger, he won the title beating Aleksandar Vukic in the final. The ATP tour canceled all tournaments from March through July due to the Coronavirus pandemic.

When the ATP resumed tournaments in August, Mannarino competed at the Cincinnati Open. He was beaten in the first round by John Millman. Seeded 32nd at the US Open, he made it to the third round where he lost to fifth seed and eventual finalist, Alexander Zverev.

In Rome, Mannarino was defeated in the first round by 13th seed Milos Raonic. At the Hamburg Open, he fell in the first round to Dušan Lajović. At the French Open, he suffered a first round loss to Albert Ramos Viñolas.

At the St. Petersburg Open, Mannarino was eliminated in the first round by qualifier Ilya Ivashka. Seeded eighth at the first edition of the Bett1Hulks Championship, he reached the quarterfinals where he lost to top seed and eventual champion, Alexander Zverev. Seeded third at the first edition of the Astana Open, he reached the final where he was defeated by fourth seed John Millman. In Paris, he made it to the third round where he fell in a tight three-set match to fourth seed and eventual finalist, Alexander Zverev. Playing his final tournament of the season at the Sofia Open, he reached the semifinal where he lost to Jannik Sinner, who would end up winning the title.

Mannarino ended the season ranked 35.

2021: Second Masters 1000 doubles quarterfinal
Mannarino started his 2021 season at the Delray Beach Open. Seeded third, he lost in the second round to Cameron Norrie. Seeded 10th at the first edition of the Murray River Open, he was defeated in the second round by Marcos Giron. Seeded 32nd at the Australian Open, he reached the third round where he was eliminated by sixth seed Alexander Zverev.

As the top seed at the Singapore Open, Mannarino made it to the quarterfinals where he was beaten by sixth seed Radu Albot. In Rotterdam, he lost in the first round to Hubert Hurkacz; he led 4–1 in the second set and held two set points at 5–4, but he ultimately lost the set and the match. At the Mexican Open, he retired during his first-round encounter against fifth seed Grigor Dimitrov. Seeded 25th at the Miami Open, he was defeated in the third round by fifth seed Diego Schwartzman.

Starting the clay-court season at the Monte-Carlo Masters, Mannarino lost in the first round to qualifier Federico Delbonis. Seeded 17th at the Barcelona Open, he was eliminated in the second round by Albert Ramos Viñolas. In Madrid, he was beaten in the first round by Spanish wildcard Carlos Alcaraz. At the Italian Open, he was defeated in round one by qualifier Hugo Dellien. In doubles, he and Benoît Paire reached the quarterfinals where they lost to second seeds and eventual champions, Nikola Mektić/Mate Pavić. Seeded eighth at the Geneva Open, he was beaten in the first round by compatriot, Arthur Cazaux. Seeded fourth at the Belgrade Open, he lost in the second round to Fernando Verdasco. At the French Open, he was defeated in his first-round match by Aljaž Bedene.

Seeded seventh at the Stuttgart Open, his first grass-court tournament of the season, Mannarino fell in the first round to qualifier James Duckworth. Competing at the Queen's Club Championships in London, he was eliminated in the second round by sixth seed Dan Evans. At the first edition of the Mallorca Open, he won his first-round match over Jan-Lennard Struff. He advanced to the quarterfinals when his opponent, second seed Dominic Thiem, retired during their second round encounter due to a right wrist injury. He ended up getting beaten in his semifinal match by Sam Querrey. At Wimbledon, he retired during his first-round match against eight-time champion and former World Number 1, Roger Federer, due to slipping behind the baseline and injuring his right knee.

Mannarino returned in August at the US Open. He lost in the second round to third seed Stefanos Tsitsipas.

Seeded sixth in Sofia, Mannarino was defeated in the first round by Gianluca Mager. At the Indian Wells Masters, he fell in his first-round match to Andy Murray. After Indian Wells, he competed at the Kremlin Cup. He stunned top seed Andrey Rublev in the second round in a rematch of the 2019 final. He ended up losing in his quarterfinals match to lucky loser Ričardas Berankis. At the St. Petersburg Open, he was defeated in the first round by sixth seed Karen Khachanov. In Paris, he won his first-round match over Nikoloz Basilashvili. He lost in the second round to 15th seed Gaël Monfils. At the Stockholm Open, he fell in his first-round match to seventh seed Márton Fucsovics.

2022: Major fourth round, Second ATP title & maiden doubles final, French No. 1
At the 2022 Australian Open Mannarino defeated the World No. 11 and tenth seed Hubert Hurkacz to advance to the third round for a second year in a row. He defeated 18th seed Aslan Karatsev to reach his first fourth round at this Major. He lost to 6th seed Rafael Nadal in straight sets with a first set tiebreak that went to 16–14 points and lasted nearly 30 minutes.

At the Rosmalen Grass Court Championships he reached his first semifinal of the season defeating Andreas Seppi, fourth seed Alex de Minaur and Brandon Nakashima before losing to top seed Daniil Medvedev.

At the 2022 Atlanta Open he reached his fifth quarterfinal of the season as a lucky loser defeating Peter Gojowczyk and debutant wildcard American Andres Martin (tennis).

At the 2022 Winston-Salem Open he reached the semifinals defeating fourth seed Maxime Cressy. Next he defeated second seed Botic van de Zandschulp to reach his first final since 2020. He won his second title defeating Laslo Djere in the final becoming the oldest champion at this tournament. As a result, he returned to the top 50 at world No. 45 in the rankings on 29 August 2022 becoming the French No. 2 player.

At the 2022 Astana Open he reached his seventh quarterfinal of the season defeating Stan Wawrinka, and lucky loser David Goffin. At the same tournament he also reached his maiden doubles final with compatriot Fabrice Martin defeating top seedsTim Pütz/Michael Venus (tennis), and Polish duo Hubert Hurkacz/Jan Zielinski in the semifinals. They lost to Croatian duo and second seeds Nikola Mektic/Mate Pavic in the final. He became French No. 1 at world No. 42 on 17 October 2022 ahead of Gael Monfils.

2023: Back-to-back ATP quarterfinals
He reached the quarterfinals at the 2023 Dallas Open defeating Jordan Thompson (tennis) before losing to eventual champion Wu Yibing and at the 2023 Delray Beach Open defeating again for a second time in the season ninth seed JJ Wolf before losing to top seed Taylor Fritz.

Performance timelines

Only main-draw results in ATP Tour, Grand Slam tournaments, Davis Cup/ATP Cup/Laver Cup and Olympic Games are included in win–loss records.

Singles
Current through the 2022 Winston-Salem Open.
{|class="nowrap wikitable" style=text-align:center;font-size:96%
!Tournament!!2007!!2008!!2009!!2010!!2011!!2012!!2013!!2014!!2015!!2016!!2017!!2018!!2019!!2020!!2021
!2022
!SR!!W–L
!Win%
|-
| colspan="20" align="left" |Grand Slam tournaments
|-
|bgcolor=efefef align=left|Australian Open
|A
|A
|bgcolor=afeeee|1R
|A
|bgcolor=afeeee|2R
|bgcolor=afeeee|1R
|bgcolor=afeeee|1R
|bgcolor=afeeee|2R
|bgcolor=afeeee|2R
|bgcolor=afeeee|1R
|bgcolor=afeeee|1R
|bgcolor=afeeee|3R
|bgcolor=afeeee|1R
|bgcolor=afeeee|1R
|bgcolor=afeeee|3R
|bgcolor=afeeee|4R
| bgcolor="efefef" |0 / 13
|bgcolor=efefef|10–13
|bgcolor=efefef|
|-
|bgcolor=efefef align=left|French Open
|Q1
|bgcolor=afeeee|1R
|bgcolor=afeeee|1R
|Q3
|bgcolor=afeeee|1R
|bgcolor=afeeee|1R
|bgcolor=afeeee|1R
|bgcolor=afeeee|2R
|bgcolor=afeeee|1R
|bgcolor=afeeee|2R
|bgcolor=afeeee|1R
|bgcolor=afeeee|1R
|bgcolor=afeeee|2R
|bgcolor=afeeee|1R
|bgcolor=afeeee|1R
|bgcolor=afeeee|1R
| bgcolor="efefef" |0 / 14
|bgcolor=efefef|3–14
|bgcolor=efefef|
|-
|bgcolor=efefef align=left|Wimbledon
|A
|Q1
|bgcolor=afeeee|1R
|Q3
|bgcolor=afeeee|2R
|Q1
|bgcolor=afeeee|4R
|bgcolor=afeeee|2R
|bgcolor=afeeee|2R
|bgcolor=afeeee|2R
|bgcolor=afeeee|4R
|bgcolor=afeeee|4R
|bgcolor=afeeee|1R
|style=color:#767676|NH
|bgcolor=afeeee|1R
|bgcolor=afeeee|2R
| bgcolor="efefef" |0 / 11
|bgcolor=efefef|14–11
|bgcolor=efefef|
|-
|bgcolor=efefef align=left|US Open
|A
|Q2
|Q2
|bgcolor=afeeee|2R
|bgcolor=afeeee|1R
|Q3
|bgcolor=afeeee|3R
|bgcolor=afeeee|3R
|bgcolor=afeeee|2R
|bgcolor=afeeee|1R
|bgcolor=afeeee|3R
|bgcolor=afeeee|1R
|bgcolor=afeeee|1R
|bgcolor=afeeee|3R
|bgcolor=afeeee|2R
|bgcolor=afeeee|1R
| bgcolor="efefef" |0 / 12
|bgcolor=efefef|11–12
|bgcolor=efefef|
|-style=background:#efefef;font-weight:bold
|align=left|Win–loss
|0–0
|0–1
|0–3
|1–1
|2–4
|0–2
|5–4
|5–4
|3–4
|2–4
|5–4
|5–4
|1–4
|2–3
|3–4
|4–4
|0 / 50
|38–50
|
|-
| colspan="20" align="left" |ATP Masters 1000
|-
|bgcolor=efefef align=left|Indian Wells Masters
|A
|A
|A
|A
|bgcolor=afeeee|1R
|A
|A
|bgcolor=afeeee|1R
|bgcolor=afeeee|4R
|bgcolor=afeeee|3R
|bgcolor=afeeee|2R
|bgcolor=afeeee|3R
|bgcolor=afeeee|2R
|style=color:#767676|NH
|bgcolor=afeeee|1R
|bgcolor=afeeee|1R
| bgcolor="efefef" |0 / 9
|bgcolor=efefef|8–9
|bgcolor=efefef|
|-
|bgcolor=efefef align=left|Miami Masters
|A
|A
|A
|A
|bgcolor=afeeee|1R
|A
|A
|bgcolor=afeeee|2R
|bgcolor=afeeee|4R
|bgcolor=afeeee|3R
|bgcolor=afeeee|4R
|bgcolor=afeeee|2R
|bgcolor=afeeee|2R
|style=color:#767676|NH
|bgcolor=afeeee|3R
|bgcolor=afeeee|1R
| bgcolor="efefef" |0 / 9
|bgcolor=efefef|10–9
|bgcolor=efefef|
|-
|bgcolor=efefef align=left|Monte Carlo Masters
|A
|A
|A
|A
|A
|A
|Q2
|A
|bgcolor=afeeee|1R
|bgcolor=afeeee|1R
|bgcolor=afeeee|3R
|bgcolor=afeeee|1R
|bgcolor=afeeee|1R
|style=color:#767676|NH
|bgcolor=afeeee|1R
|Q1
| bgcolor="efefef" |0 / 6
|bgcolor=efefef|2–6
|bgcolor=efefef|
|-
|bgcolor=efefef align=left|Rome Masters
|A
|A
|A
|A
|bgcolor=afeeee|1R
|A
|Q1
|Q2
|bgcolor=afeeee|1R
|A
|bgcolor=afeeee|1R
|bgcolor=afeeee|1R
|A
|bgcolor=afeeee|1R
|bgcolor=afeeee|1R
|Q1
| bgcolor="efefef" |0 / 6
|bgcolor=efefef|0–6
|bgcolor=efefef|
|-
|bgcolor=efefef align=left|Madrid Masters
|A
|A
|A
|A
|bgcolor=afeeee|2R
|A
|A
|Q1
|bgcolor=afeeee|1R
|Q1
|bgcolor=afeeee|1R
|bgcolor=afeeee|1R
|bgcolor=afeeee|2R
|style=color:#767676|NH
|bgcolor=afeeee|1R
|Q1
| bgcolor="efefef" |0 / 6
|bgcolor=efefef|2–6
|bgcolor=efefef|
|-
|bgcolor=efefef align=left|Canada Masters
|A
|A
|A
|A
|bgcolor=afeeee|1R
|A
|Q2
|A
|bgcolor=afeeee|1R
|A
|bgcolor=ffebcd|QF
|bgcolor=afeeee|1R
|bgcolor=afeeee|3R
|style=color:#767676|NH
|A
|bgcolor=afeeee|2R
| bgcolor="efefef" |0 / 6
|bgcolor=efefef|6–6
|bgcolor=efefef|
|-
|bgcolor=efefef align=left|Cincinnati Masters
|A
|A
|A
|A
|Q2
|A
|bgcolor=afeeee|1R
|Q2
|bgcolor=afeeee|1R
|bgcolor=afeeee|1R
|bgcolor=afeeee|3R
|bgcolor=afeeee|2R
|bgcolor=afeeee|3R
|bgcolor=afeeee|1R
|A
|Q1
| bgcolor="efefef" |0 / 7
|bgcolor=efefef|5–7
|bgcolor=efefef|
|-
|bgcolor=efefef align=left|Shanghai Masters
|A 
|A
|A
|A
|A
|A
|A
|A
|bgcolor=afeeee|1R
|Q1
|bgcolor=afeeee|1R
|bgcolor=afeeee|1R
|Q1
|colspan=3 style=color:#767676|NH
| bgcolor="efefef" |0 / 3
|bgcolor=efefef|0–3
|bgcolor=efefef|
|-
|bgcolor=efefef align=left|Paris Masters
|A
|bgcolor=afeeee|1R
|A
|A
|bgcolor=afeeee|2R
|A
|bgcolor=afeeee|1R
|bgcolor=afeeee|2R
|bgcolor=afeeee|1R
|bgcolor=afeeee|1R
|bgcolor=afeeee|2R
|bgcolor=afeeee|2R
|bgcolor=afeeee|2R
|bgcolor=afeeee|3R
|bgcolor=afeeee|2R
|bgcolor=afeeee|2R
|bgcolor="efefef" |0 / 12
|bgcolor=efefef|8–12
|bgcolor=efefef|
|-style=background:#efefef;font-weight:bold
|align=left|Win–loss
|0–0
|0–1
|0–0
|0–0
|2–6
|0–0
|0–2
|2–3
|5–9
|4–5
|12–9
|3–9
|8–7
|2–3
|2–6
|1–4
|0 / 64
|41–64
|
|-
| colspan="20" align="left" |Career statistics
|-bgcolor=efefef
|align=left|Tournaments
|0
|3
|4
|4
|23
|7
|16
|22
|30
|28
|27
|30
|26
|17
|24
|27
|colspan=3|Career total: 289
|-style=background:#efefef;font-weight:bold
|align=left|Titles
|0
|0
|0
|0
|0
|0
|0
|0
|0
|0
|0
|0
|1
|0
|0
|1
|colspan=3|Career total: 2
|-style=background:#efefef;font-weight:bold
|align=left|Finals
|0
|0
|0
|0
|0
|0
|0
|0
|2
|0
|2
|2
|3
|1
|0
|1
|colspan=3|Career total: 11
|-style=background:#efefef;font-weight:bold
|align=left|Overall win–loss
|0–0
|3–3
|0–4
|2–4
|17–23
|1–7
|10–15
|16–23
|28–29
|26–28
|33–27
|26–30
|27–26
|14–17
|14–26
|28–26
|2 / 282
|245–288
|
|-bgcolor=efefef
|align=left|Year-end ranking
|367
|131
|180
|83
|87
|188
|60
|44
|47
|60
|28
|42
|43
|35
|71
|46
|colspan=3|{{Tooltip| $9,681,532 |Career Prize Money – Singles & Doubles combined}}
|}

ATP Tour career finals

Singles: 11 (2 titles, 9 runner-ups)

Doubles: 1 (1 runner-up)

ATP Challenger Tour/Futures finals

Singles: 32 (20 titles, 12 runner–ups)

Doubles: 5 (4 titles, 1 runner–up)

Record against other players

Record against top 10 players

Mannarino's match record against those who have been ranked in the top 10, with those who have been No. 1 in bold (ATP World Tour, Grand Slam and Davis Cup main draw matches).

  Daniil Medvedev 3–2  Ernests Gulbis 2–0
  Juan Mónaco 2–0
  Lucas Pouille 2–1
  Gilles Simon 2–1
  Fabio Fognini 2–3
  Fernando Verdasco 2–3
  Gaël Monfils 2–4
  Jack Sock 2–4
  David Goffin 2–5
  Matteo Berrettini 1–0
  James Blake 1–0
  Arnaud Clément 1–0
  Nikolay Davydenko 1–0
  Tommy Haas 1–0
  Casper Ruud 1–0
  Stan Wawrinka 1–0
  Nicolás Almagro 1–1
  Hubert Hurkacz 1–1
  Andrey Rublev 1–1
  Denis Shapovalov 1–1
  Marcos Baghdatis 1–2
  Marin Čilić 1–2
  Juan Martin del Potro 1–2
  David Ferrer 1–2
  Stefanos Tsitsipas 1–2
  Jo Wilfried Tsonga 1–2
  Roberto Bautista Agut 1–3
  Cameron Norrie 1–3
  Milos Raonic 1–3
  Kevin Anderson 1–5
  John Isner 1–8
  Dominic Thiem 1–8
  Carlos Alcaraz 0–1
  Mardy Fish 0–1
  Lleyton Hewitt 0–1  Jürgen Melzer 0–1
  Mikhail Youzhny 0–1
  Pablo Carreño Busta 0–2
  Richard Gasquet 0–2
  Kei Nishikori 0–2
  Tommy Robredo 0–2
  Diego Schwartzman 0–2
  Jannik Sinner 0–2
  Andy Murray 0–3  Rafael Nadal 0–3  Grigor Dimitrov 0–4
  Novak Djokovic 0–4  Karen Khachanov 0–4
  Tomáš Berdych 0–5
  Roger Federer 0–6'  Alexander Zverev 0–7* ''

Wins against top-10 players
Mannarino has a  record against players who were, at the time the match was played, ranked in the top 10.

References

External links 

 
 
 
 
 

1988 births
Living people
People from Soisy-sous-Montmorency
French people of Italian descent
French male tennis players
Sportspeople from Val-d'Oise
21st-century French people